Ghiyath-ud-din Tughluq Shah II, born Tughluq Khan, was the son of  Fateh Khan and the grandson of  Firoz Shah Tughlaq. He was a Sultan of the Tughlaq dynasty of the Delhi Sultanate; he ascended to the throne in 1388 C.E. However, a succession crisis started almost immediately with Muhammad Shah ibn Firoz Shah staking his claim with the support of his brother Zafar Khan's son Abu Bakr Khan. Tughlaq Khan dispatched troops against his uncle towards the foot of the hills of Sirmur. Muhammad Shah Tughlaq ibn Firoz Shah after a brief battle took shelter in the Fort of Kangra, and Tughlaq Khan's army returned to Delhi without pursuing him any further due to the difficulties of the venture & terrain. Eventually though some Amirs joined Abu Bakr Khan son of Zafar Khan and  grandson of Sultan Firoz Shah Tughlaq and plotted to assassinate Tughluq Khan. In 1389 they surrounded the Sultan and Jahan Khan, his vizier, and put them to death and hung up their heads over the gate of the Delhi city; the duration of the reign of Tughluq Khan, was five months and eighteen days.

References

Tughluq sultans
14th-century births
1389 deaths
14th-century Indian Muslims
14th-century murdered monarchs
People murdered in India
14th-century Indian monarchs
Year of birth unknown